Gary Grewal is a Canadian politician, who was elected to the Legislative Assembly of Saskatchewan in the 2020 Saskatchewan general election. He represents the electoral district of Regina Northeast as a member of the Saskatchewan Party.

Political career 
Grewal contested Regina Northeast at the 2018 by-election, but lost to the NDP. In the general election two years later, he won Regina Northeast.

References 

Living people
Politicians from Regina, Saskatchewan
Saskatchewan Party MLAs
21st-century Canadian politicians
Year of birth missing (living people)
Canadian politicians of Indian descent